Hans-Georg von der Marwitz (born 8 April 1961) is a German farmer and politician of the Christian Democratic Union (CDU) who served as a member of the Bundestag from the state of Brandenburg from 2009 until 2021.

Political career 
Von der Marwitz became a member of the Bundestag after the 2009 German federal election. He was a member of the Committee for Food and Agriculture. In June 2021, Marwitz announced that he will not be standing in the 2021 German federal election.

References

External links 

  
 Bundestag biography 

1961 births
Living people
Members of the Bundestag for Brandenburg
Members of the Bundestag 2017–2021
Members of the Bundestag 2013–2017
Members of the Bundestag 2009–2013
Politicians from Heidelberg
Members of the Bundestag for the Christian Democratic Union of Germany
Marwitz family
German farmers